Božo Krišto (born ) is a Croatian male weightlifter, competing in the 94 kg category and representing Croatia at international competitions. He competed at world championships, most recently at the 1998 World Weightlifting Championships. In 2016 he was appointed coach of the Croatian national weightlifting team.

Major results

References

1964 births
Living people
Croatian male weightlifters
Place of birth missing (living people)